Rayo Vallecano de Madrid, S.A.D., often abbreviated to Rayo (Spanish for "thunderbolt"), is a Spanish professional football club based in Madrid, in the neighbourhood of Vallecas. Rayo was founded on 29 May 1924, and currently compete in La Liga following promotion from the 2020–21 Segunda División. Home games are held at the 14,708-seater Campo de Fútbol de Vallecas stadium.

Rayo has competed in one European competition, the UEFA Cup in the 2000–01 season. The club made it to the quarter-finals before losing to fellow Spanish club Alavés 4–2 on aggregate.

By historical standard, Rayo is the third best club in Community of Madrid, after Real Madrid and Atlético Madrid.

History

Establishment and early years
Rayo Vallecano was founded on 29 May 1924 in the hometown of Prudencia Priego, wife of the club's first president Julián Huerta. Greatly inspired by River Plate (a Football club from Argentina), in 1949, after an agreement with Atlético Madrid, a red diagonal stripe was added to the team's kit, and the club reached Tercera División for the first time in its history.

Yo-yo years
One of the perennial yo-yo clubs of Spanish football, and always in the shadow of the two biggest clubs in the city (Real Madrid and Atlético Madrid), Rayo Vallecano spent many years during the 1980s and 1990s moving back and forth between La Liga and Segunda División. The 1983-84 season was the worst during the 1980s. The club finished in the last position in Segunda División and was relegated to Segunda División B. 

Due to a tragedy Rayo Vallecano turned out to be Laurie Cunningham's last club; he was killed in a car crash just outside Madrid in 1989, after a sole season. He had recently won an F.A. Cup winners medal with Wimbledon F.C. in England the previous year and had also represented neighbours Real Madrid for four years.

They appeared to have consolidated their top flight status after gaining promotion in 1999, and the team's most successful season came in 2000–01 when they reached the quarter-finals of the UEFA Cup, going out only to eventual runners-up Alavés; Rayo finished ninth in the previous campaign, but entered the competition via the fair play draw.

2003–11: Segunda División and below

However, the club shortly thereafter fell on hard times, enduring successive relegations in 2003 and 2004. For 2005–06 manager Míchel, a Real Madrid legend in the 1980s and '90s, was hired.

Rayo finished the 2006–07 season in second place in Segunda División B, winning the promotion play-off semifinal but losing in the final to Eibar (1–2 aggregate). The following campaign, the team returned to division two after a four-year absence after a victorious run in the playoffs, disposing of Benidorm in the semi-final and Zamora in the last game 2–1 on aggregate.

In its first seasons back in the second tier of Spanish football, Rayo finished comfortably, often either in or just outside the promotion places. In 2010–11, the team ranked in second position and returned to the top flight after an eight-year absence, only trailing champions Real Betis in spite of very serious economic problems.

2011–: La Liga and Segunda División yo-yo

In March 2014, Huawei agreed to sponsor Rayo Vallecano for two league matches against Real Madrid and Athletic Bilbao.

In August 2015, Rayo Vallecano purchased the majority of Oklahoma City FC, a NASL expansion franchise which had yet to officially play a game renaming the club to Rayo OKC, despite the stadium increasingly needing work. It was the first ever entry of a Spanish club into the American sports market and mirrored a 2013 sponsorship agreement with Qbao in terms of expanding the club's profile overseas. Rayo OKC folded after a year due to Rayo Vallecano's relegation from La Liga and a dispute between the co-owners led to less finance for the U.S. side.

In May 2016, Rayo Vallecano were relegated to the Segunda División, finishing 18th in the 2015–16 La Liga season. This ended their five-year streak in La Liga, their longest ever stay in the top-flight. Their first season back in the second division was a poor one, with both problems on the field and off, and they finished in 12th position. Rayo went through three different managers in the 2016–17 Segunda División season before finally settling on club legend Míchel. He revived the club from the relegation places to 12th, almost making the playoffs.

At the start of the 2017–18 Segunda División season, the club appointed their recently retired goalkeeper David Cobeño as the sporting director of the club. They secured their promotion with a 1-0 over CD Lugo with one game remaining. That season the club won Segunda División with 76 points in 42 games.

On 20 March 2019, the club appointed Paco Jémez as head coach,  and on 4 May, Rayo was relegated back to the Segunda División after losing 4–1 to Levante UD, eventually finishing last

In August 2020, the club appointed Andoni Iraola as head coach. They finished sixth and won promotion in the playoffs against Girona FC; despite losing the first leg at home 1–2, the team came back to win the second leg 2-0 away to claim a place in La Liga for 2021–22. In February 2022, Iraola's side defeated RCD Mallorca to make the semi-finals of the Copa del Rey; it was the second time in club history and first since 1982. The club finished 12th in La Liga. This was a big achievement as they were by far the leagues smallest team, and most had predicted that they would be relegated.

Previous names

Agrupación Deportiva El Rayo (29 May 1924 – 13 November 1947)
Agrupación Deportiva Rayo Vallecano (13 November 1947 – 1995)
Rayo Vallecano de Madrid (1995 – Present)

N.B. Affiliate of  Atlético Madrid in 1949–50

Honours

League
 Segunda División
Winners (1): 2017–18
 Runners-up: 1988–89, 1991–92, 1994–95, 2010–11
Segunda División B
Winners (4): 1955-56, 1964–65, 1984–85, 2007–08

Regional Titles

 Workers Federation of Soccer (1): 1931-1932
 First Regional Division (1): 1948-1949
 Second Regional Division (1): 1940-1941
 Copa de Castilla (5): 1952-1953, 1967-1968, 1970-1971, 1972-1973, 1981-1982
 Madrid Cup (2): 1952-1953, 1966-1967
 Copa Ramón Triana (2): 1971-1972, 1973-1974

Season to season

20 seasons in La Liga
35 seasons in Segunda División
5 seasons in Segunda División B
11 seasons in Tercera División (third level before 1977–78)

European history

Current squad

Reserve team

Out on loan

Current technical staff

 Miguel Ángel Martín Miguel García

Notable former players
Note: this list includes players that have played at least 100 league games and/or have reached international status.

Coaches

Club presidents

Stadium

Campo de Fútbol de Vallecas is a football stadium located on Calle Payaso Fofó 1, Vallecas. Opened on 10 May 1976, at first it was called "New Stadium Vallecas", but in January 2004, 13 years after the arrival of the Ruiz-Mateos family in 1991, it changed denominations, as the wife was also named by her husband, businessman José María, the first woman president of an elite football team.

It has a capacity of 14,708 spectators in an all-seated format and dimensions of 100×67 m. after the enlargement of the width and the reduction of the length of the pitch after the remodelling of the grandstands, compulsory due to the elimination of the fences surrounding the pitch. The pitch is one the smallest in La Liga. Additionally, one of the goal ends does not have a grandstand, just a big wall with information panels.

In June 2009, the club announced plans for the construction of a new stadium. Nevertheless, the Autonomous Community of Madrid, owner of the stadium, has not any plan as far as it is known in 2023.

Club culture and supporters
The club is known for being one of the last local neighbourhood clubs in Spain, with the club representing the barrio and its working-class status. Rayo's ultras, the Bukaneros, are known for their left-wing views and often display political messages and other protests, mainly against the commercialisation of football. Rayo's ultras often display anti-racism and anti-fascist messages. Former player Roman Zozulya left the club after one training session due to chants of 'Nazi' by Rayo fans, and a later game was called off at half-time when Zozulya (now playing for Albacete) was subjected to similar chants.

The fans do not have a good relationship with the current owner Raúl Martín Presa and regular chant for him to leave.

The Spanish anti-fascist band Ska-P are outspoken supporters of the club and have dedicated two songs to it, named Como un Rayo and Rayo Vallecano.

Rayo's players are often involved in charity work, one instance of this is that the club captain Roberto Trashorras (who played for the club between 2011 and 2018), amongst other players, regularly helped out at a homeless shelter.

In late March 2012, in support of the 2011–12 Spanish protests, the squad decided to take one day off from training to join the demonstrations. In 2014, 85-year-old Vallecas resident Carmen Martínez Ayuso was evicted from her house after living there since the 1960s. Rayo Vallecano and particularly coach Paco Jémez were touched by her story, and subsequently offered to fund Martínez for the foreseeable future.

Anthems and songs
Although most people recognise the supporting songs by ska-punk band Ska-P (Rayo Vallecano and Como un rayo), Rayo Vallecano has an official anthem which played at their home stadium before matches.

The club is also known for chanting the song "La Vida Pirata", a song about pirates, which the Bukaneros are named after.

Spanish:

La vida pirata es la vida mejor (bis)

sin trabajar (bis)

Sin estudiar (bis)

Con la botella de ron (bis)

Soy capitán (bis)

del Santa Inés (bis)

Y en cada puerto tengo una mujer (bis)

La rubia es (bis)

Fenomenal (bis)

Y la morena tampoco esta mal (bis)

Las inglesas con su seriedad (bis)

Y las francesas que todo lo dan (bis)

Si alguna vez (bis)

Me he de casar (bis)

Me he de casar (bis)

Con la del Rayo, una, una y nada más (bis).

English:

'The pirate life is the best life (bis)without working (bis)without studying (bis)With the bottle of rum (bis)I am captain (bis)of the "Santa Inés"' (bis)and in each port, I have a woman (bis) the blonde is (bis) phenomenal (bis)and the brunette is not bad either (bis)The English women with their seriousness (bis)And the French women who give everything (bis)If ever (bis)I have to marry (bis) I have to marry (bis)with the one of Rayo, one, one and no more (bis).'

Notes

References

External links

Official website 
Official Radio website 
Official Community VK 
Futbolme team profile 
BDFutbol team profile
Pasión por el Rayo – Non official Website - Rayo Vallecano News 
Rayo Herald – Updated club info 

 
Football clubs in Madrid
Association football clubs established in 1924
1924 establishments in Spain
Segunda División clubs
La Liga clubs